Keri Marie Herman (born August 16, 1982) is an American freestyle skier and US Olympian. She placed 10th in Slopestyle at the 2014 Sochi Games. She won a silver medal in Slopestyle at the 2011 Winter X Games XV in Aspen, Colorado, behind Kaya Turski. The following week, Herman took bronze at the 2011 FIS Freestyle World Ski Championships. Herman now holds a total of 5 Winter X Games medals. 3 in Aspen and 2 from European X Games in Tignes, France.  Keri Herman grew up in Bloomington, MN. She played ice hockey during her four years at Visitation High School as Center for the Visitation Blazers team. She moved to CO to attend the University of Denver where she graduated in 2005 with a BSBA in Finance and Marketing.  She studied abroad for a semester at the University of Queensland, Australia. She moved to Breckenridge in 2004 where she has since lived, traveling around the world competing in Slopestyle and Halfpipe skiing events.  In 2011, she was named to the first US Freeskiing Slopestyle team.  Her sponsors are ROCKSTAR Energy, Scott USA, Breckenridge Resort, HEAD SKIS, US Freeskiing, Buff, Jiberish, and Discrete.

References

External links
 
 
 
 
 

1982 births
Living people
American female freestyle skiers
Olympic freestyle skiers of the United States
Freestyle skiers at the 2014 Winter Olympics
X Games athletes
University of Denver alumni
Sportspeople from Minnesota
People from Bloomington, Minnesota
21st-century American women